Royle is a surname. The surname may derive from Ryal in Northumberland, England.

People:
 Amanda Royle (born 1962), English actress, second daughter of Derek Royle 
 Adrian Royle (born 1959), retired English long distance runner
 Anthony Royle, Baron Fanshawe of Richmond (1927–2001), British politician and businessman, son of Lancelot Royle
 Arthur Royle, English rugby union footballer who played in the 1880s
 Arthur Royle (priest) (1895–1973), Church of England Archdeacon of Huntingdon
 Carol Royle (born 1954), English actress, elder daughter of Derek Royle 
 Charles Royle, Baron Royle (1896–1975), British businessman and politician
 Charles Royle (Liberal politician) (1872–1963), English politician
 David Royle (disambiguation), two people
 Derek Royle (1928–1990), English actor, father of Amanda and Carol Royle
 Edward Royle, British historian
 Edwin Milton Royle (1862–1942), American playwright
 Gordon Royle, Australian mathematician and professor
 Guy Royle (1885–1954), Royal Navy admiral, Fifth Sea Lord and First Naval Member of the Royal Australian Navy
 Jen Royle (born 1974), former American sports reporter and chef
 Joe Royle (born 1949), English football player and manager
 John Forbes Royle (1799–1858), British botanist
 Joseph Royle (1732–1766), colonial American newspaper publisher and printer
 Lancelot Royle (1898–1978), British sprinter and businessman, son of Vernon Royle
 Nicholas Royle (born 1963), English novelist, editor, publisher and literary reviewer
 Nick Royle (born 1983), English rugby union players
 Pam Royle (born 1958), British television presenter and journalist
 Paul Royle (1914–2015), Australian Royal Air Force pilot, one of the last two survivors of the Second World War "Great Escape" from a German POW camp
 Roger Royle (born 1939), Anglican priest and television presenter
 Selena Royle (1904–1983), American actress, daughter of Edwin Royle
 Stanley Royle (1888–1961), English landscape painter and illustrator
 Timothy Royle (born 1931), businessman, son of Lancelot Royle
 Vernon Royle (1854–1929), English cricketer

Fictional characters:
 the title characters in The Royle Family, a television comedy series
 Joan Daisy Royle, in That Royle Girl, a 1925 film directed by D. W. Griffith
 Eddie Royle (EastEnders), in the soap opera EastEnders
 John Royle (EastEnders), in the soap opera EastEnders

References

See also
 Royal (name), a list of people with the surname or given name